Carl August Adlersparre (7 June 1810 – 5 May 1862) was a Swedish count (1835), chamberlain (1838), poet, novelist and historian from the Adlersparre family. He was known under his pen name Albano.

Life
Carl August Adlersparre was born in Kristinehamn, Värmland; the oldest son of Georg Adlersparre (1760–1835) and Lovisa Magdalena Linroth (1784–1866). 
As a student he pursue the military career and in 1841 became lieutenant in the Värmland field Hunters Regiment, but took leave in 1845.
In 1848 he married Charlotte Aurore Jeanette von Platen (1821-1853) who bore him a daughter, Louise Henrietta Adlersparre (1850–1875).
He died in Stockholm, aged almost 52.

Work
He wrote poem and novels in the romantic style but without deep
motivation. For these efforts he was awarded five minor Swedish academic prices (1834–43).
Here is a selection of his poems:
  Ungdoms-dikter (Youth Poems), Förf., Stockholm,  1830 
  Hugo: en romantisk dikt (Hugo, a romantic poem), Carlstad, 1840 
  Smärre samlade dikter (Minor collected poems), Carlstad, 1841 

In prose he wrote, among others:
  Skizzer och reseminnen (Sketches and Travel Memories), 1844
  Smärre skizzer (Minor Sketches) in 2 volumes, Albert Bonniers, Stockholm, 1849-50

He is mostly remembered for his historical biographies:
  1809 års revolution och dess män (The 1809 revolution and its men), 2 vol., Stockholm, 1849, Albert Bonniers Föorlag
  1809 Och 1810: Tidstaflor, 3 vol., Stockholm, 1850, Albert Bonniers Föorlag
  Anteckningar om bortgångne samtida, 3 vol., Stockholm 1860-1862, Albert Bonniers

See also
Stockholms Figaro

Notes

References

Swedish male writers
1810 births
1862 deaths
People from Kristinehamn
People from Kristinehamn Municipality
Carl August